Bashiri Johnson (born May 12, 1955) is a New York City-based percussionist, whose work has appeared on many records, as well as in commercials, films, television, videogames, and concert performances. He is known to be one of the most recorded percussionists in the music business, as well as one of the most visible. While he has recorded with such artists as Luther Vandross, Miles Davis, and Patti LaBelle, he has also been a part of numerous on-stage performances; he has performed on stage with artists such as Sting, Michael Jackson, Whitney Houston, Lionel Richie, Aretha Franklin, and Steve Winwood.

Musical career 

His interest in music and percussion started at a very young age, when growing up in Bedford Stuyvesant, Brooklyn, during the 1960s. According to his mother, his talents in percussion started as early as pre-school with drumming on desks and furniture, occasionally to the extent of disrupting class.

Growing up in the 1960s and 70s, he pulled musical influence from a number of popular movements, musicians and percussionists of the time. Those include Sly, Hendrix, Cream, The Panthers, and artists such as Airto, Big Black, Tito Puente, Ralph McDonald, Bill Summers, Paulinho DaCosta, Miles, James Brown and Bootsy were also strong influences on the young Bashiri Johnson.
 
Formal percussion education took a number of forms for Johnson, including high school bands, lessons at Jazzmobile, lessons at the Dance Theater of Harlem, and with Olatunji. A three-year mentorship with Mtume also served as a hallmark of his early education and career. The time spent with Mtume during the 1970s taught Johnson not only the art of percussion, but the world of the music business and session recording. It led to his first professional session on “Watcha Gonna Do With My Lovin’” by Stephanie Mills, which went gold.

His career grew rapidly in the 1970s and 80s, and Johnson was able to contribute to other gold records by artists such as Luther Vandross, and Madonna. Since then, Johnson has been recorded on hundreds of records, worked with some of the most well-known artists, and performed for some major political figures. Notably, he performed in Whitney Houston’s band for 20 years, was a percussionist for Michael Jackson in the "This Is It" band. He has performed for Nelson Mandela in South Africa, as well as at the 2013 Presidential Inauguration. Bashiri Johnson has also performed at the White House as part of two separate "In Performance at the White House" presentations. Once for the presentation of the Gershwin Prize for Popular Song, and once for "The Motown Sound."

His most recent endeavors include participating in Michael Jackson The Immortal World Tour with Cirque du Soleil, while continuing to write, produce, and perform in a variety of media. Among his endeavors and accomplishments are a production company (Bashman Productions), record/media label (Life in Rhythm Media), and recording studio (The Lab-Brooklyn). Through The Lab-Brooklyn, Bashiri Johnson has recorded his percussion for a number of notable artists, including Herbie Hancock, Barbra Streisand, George Benson, Al Jarreau and many others. Bashiri Johnson also presents percussion intensive seminars, as well as lectures, workshops and master classes to share his knowledge and give back to young people.

Discography 
 Art 'n' Rhythm (BBE Music, 2007)
 Soul Liberation  (Life in Rhythm Media, 2007)
 Musical Aesop (Life in Rhythm Media, 2009) 
 Musical Alphabet (Life in Rhythm Media, 2009)
 Musical Multiplication (Life In Rhythm Media, 2010)

Filmography 
 This Is It
 Get Him to the Greek
 The 2012 Rock and Roll Hall of Fame Induction Ceremony
 Crazy Love
 The Hoax
 Slavery and the Making of America, "Liberty in the Air"
 Naked World: America Undercover
 Michael Jackson: 30th Anniversary Celebration
 Hitch
 Mission Impossible
 The Score
 Godzilla
 The Mask
 Last Holiday
 Sex and The City 2
 Welcome Home Heroes with Whitney Houston
 Whitney: Brunei The Royal Wedding Celebration
 Classic Whitney Live from Washington D.C.
 Sting: A Winter's Night Live from Durham Cathedral

He has appeared in the following films:

 This Is It (2009)
 Get Him to the Greek
 Whitney Houston: Concert for South Africa

Awards

He has been nominated by readers of Drum! Magazine and DRUMmagazine.com for two "Drummies.”

 2010 Percussionist of the Year
 2011 World Percussionist

In a ModernDrummer reader's poll, Bashiri Johnson was voted in 2011 as a top 5 percussionist.

Products

Percussion Libraries 

 “Bitz & Piecez” Volume 1 (Industrial Strength)- Winner of a "Loop Masters VIP Award" 
 “Bitz & Piecez” Volume 2 (Industrial Strength) 
 Supreme Beats (Spectrasonics)
 Ethno Techno (Ilio)
 Up From the Curb (Kurzweil Music Systems)

Educational 
The Rhythmic Construction of Dance, Pop, R&B, and Hip-Hop (2005)

Wellness 

He is also behind the creation of wellness product supplements and a product and service line.
 
 Wholeness Well Being Formula®  
 Rhythm Healing™

References

External links 
 Bashiri Johnson Webpage
 Interview About Whitney Houston
 Interview About Michael Jackson
 Interview with Remo and Jonathan Moffett about Michael Jackson

1955 births
African-American composers
African-American male composers
20th-century African-American male singers
African-American record producers
American percussionists
Living people
Members Only (band) members
Musicians from Brooklyn
Record producers from New York (state)
Songwriters from New York (state)
African-American songwriters
21st-century African-American people
American male songwriters